A grandma is a female grandparent.

Grandma may also refer to:

Grandma (album), by Unique, 2018
Grandma (comic strip), a 1947–1969 strip by Charles Kuhn
Grandma (1979 film) or La Nona, an Argentine comedy drama film
Grandma (2015 film), a comedy-drama film by Paul Weitz
Grandma (2022 film), an Indian Tamil-language thriller film
Khonnor or Grandma (born 1986), American electronic musician
"Grandma", a song by ASAP Ferg from Always Strive and Prosper, 2016

See also

Grama (disambiguation)
Gramma (disambiguation)
Grandmama (The Addams Family)
Granma (disambiguation)
Granny (disambiguation)